Rugby union in Taiwan (also known as the Republic of China, and formerly as Formosa) is a significant sport. For political reasons, they compete as Chinese Taipei. They are currently ranked 61st, and have 3040 registered players.

Governing body
The Taiwanese Rugby Union was founded in 1946, and joined the IRFB in 1986. Concerning its foundation, the efforts of Ke Zhi-Zhang (a.k.a. Ka Shi-Sho:柯子彰 in Japan) cannot be overlooked.

History

Rugby in Taiwan goes back to the turn of the 20th century,  when the island was known as "Formosa". It has been claimed that it was being played even earlier by European sailors (as in Mainland China, and Japan).

Unlike the PRC, rugby union has an unbroken history in Taiwan, but the Chinese Civil War and souring of relations with the mainland has meant it was effectively cut off.

The game has a long presence in this part of Asia, especially Japan and Hong Kong. Rugby was also played in Shanghai at an early date, and is played to a high degree in South Korea. Right now, Taiwan is no. 4 in Asia, behind Japan, South Korea and Hong Kong.

Not unlike South Korea, Taiwanese rugby has grown with the local economy, and has been tied up with corporate interests. Growing economic links with Japan, a major rugby playing nation, have helped the game in Taiwan from the 1960s to the present.  Another thing that Taiwan has in common with South Korea is that it has always performed better at rugby sevens than the fifteen a side game.

During the 70s and 80s, Taiwanese rugby underwent a big development programme, addressing issues such as the shortage of pitches. However, Taiwanese rugby is not short of other resources, and administrators such as Lin Chang Tang have been a great boon.

Traditionally, Taiwan has suffered from a shortage of pitches. Taiwan is considered to be the fourth rugby nation of East Asia, after Japan, South Korea, and Hong Kong respectively, although developments in the PRC and Malaysia may change that position.

Notable Taiwanese players include -
 Chae Wei-Che  
 Chang Chyi-Ming  
 Tseng Chi-Ming

The Chinese Question

Because Taiwan's relationship with the People's Republic of China is an incredibly complex one, it competes under the name Chung Hua Taipei or "Chinese Taipei", rather than as either Taiwan or the Republic of China.

Because of political issues, with some commentators trying to work out how the entry of the PRC into international rugby would affect Taiwan's position. When the PRC joined the UN, it resulted in the expulsion of Taiwan.

See also 
 Chinese Taipei national rugby union team 
 Chinese Taipei national rugby sevens team

References

External links
 IRB Taiwan page
  Official Union Page
 Rugby in Asia, Taiwan page
 Taiwan rugby monument
 Asian Rugby Football Union
 Taiwan Rugby Union
 Archives du Rugby: Taiwan